Odd Selmer (born 7 February 1930) is a Norwegian journalist, novelist, crime fiction writer and playwright. In 1977 he wrote a historical novel about the eccentric "Lady" Barbara Arbuthnott. His audio plays have been translated into fifteen languages. He was awarded the Ibsen Prize in 1988 for the audio play series På egne ben.

References

1930 births
People from Trondheim
Norwegian journalists
20th-century Norwegian novelists
21st-century Norwegian novelists
Norwegian crime fiction writers
Norwegian dramatists and playwrights
Living people